Milionia zonea, commonly known as pine moth, is a moth in the family Geometridae. It was first described by English entomologist, Herbert Druce, in 1888. The species was considered to be a synonym of Milionia basalis however it was listed as a valid species in 2005 by Japanese entomologist, Hiromitsu Inoue, based on its distinct genetic characteristics.

It is a diurnal (day flying) looper moth, found in Taiwan, Japan through to Sundaland and the Philippines. In 2016 it was detected in Hong Kong.

Subspecies
It has two subspecies:
 Milionia zonea pryeri
 Milionia zonea zonea

References 

Boarmiini
Moths of Asia